Rory Pitman (born 6 October 1989) is a Welsh rugby union footballer for the Jersey Reds.

Pitman played rugby league for the South Wales Scorpions in the Championship 1 as a second row, making one appearance for them in 2012.

Pitman joined the Welsh rugby union region the Ospreys but he was released by the Ospreys in July 2012.

On 6 June 2014, it was confirmed that Pitman would be joining the Welsh rugby region Scarlets for the 2014/15 season. In his Scarlets competitive début, he scored two tries and was awarded man of the match against Ulster.
In November 2018, Pitman signed for Doncaster Knights on a short term deal, this leaving Cardiff RFC and Bridgend Sunday Football team Seagull FC.

References

1989 births
Living people
Glasgow Warriors players
Jersey Reds players
London Welsh RFC players
Ospreys (rugby union) players
Rotherham Titans players
Rugby league players from Bridgend
Rugby union players from Bridgend
Scarlets players
South Wales Scorpions players
Wasps RFC players
Welsh rugby league players
Welsh rugby union players